Throughout railroad history, many manufacturing companies have come and gone. This is a list of companies that manufactured railroad cars and other rolling stock. Most of these companies built both passenger and freight equipment and no distinction is made between the two for the purposes of this list.

Note that this list includes names of works owned by railroads for manufacturing their own rolling stock.


Argentina
 Astarsa
 COMETARSA
 Emepa Group
 Emprendimientos Ferroviarios
 Fabricaciones Militares
 Fábrica Argentina de Locomotoras
 Fábrica Argentina de Vagones y Silos
 Materfer
 SABB S.A.
 TecnoTren
 PINAT EDO srl

Australia
 Alstom, Australia
 Bombardier Transportation, Australia
 Downer Rail
 UGL Rail
 Bradken
 Commonwealth Engineering, Australia

Azerbaijan
 Baku Carriage Repair Factory
 Baku Metro
 STP-Wagon-Building Factory

Belgium
 BN Bombardier Brugge

Brazil
 Andrade Gutierrez
 MAFERSA
 COBRASMA

Bulgaria
 VRZ Karlovo
 Express Service Ltd

Canada
 ARS Canada Rolling Stock
 Arva Industries
 Napanee Industries, Napanee, Ontario
 Procor, Oakville, Ontario
 Railwest Manufacturing, Squamish, British Columbia
 Woodstock Precision Machining Inc
 Enertec Rail Equipment

China

 China CNR (folded into CRRC)
 CRRC
 CSR Corporation Limited (folded into CRRC)
SJJ Railway Material & Supply, China

Croatia
 Končar
 Đuro Đaković

Czechia
 Škoda Transportation
 Bombardier Transportation, Czech
 CZ Loko

Egypt
 Arab Organization for Industrialization (Semaf)
 Metallurgical Industry holding (El-Nasr Forging Company)
 National Egyptian Railway Industries Company.

Finland
 Alstom
 Škoda Transtech

France
 Alstom
 Bombardier Transportation, France
 Faiveley Transport
 Lohr Industrie
 SEMT Pielstick
 Socofer
 Titagarh Wagons AFR

Germany
 Siemens Mobility
 Bombardier Transportation, Germany (Acquired by Alstom since Jan 2021)
 Voith
 Vossloh
 Alstom
 WBN Waggonbau Niesky GmbH

Greece
 Bombardier Transportation, Greece
 Hellenic Shipyards Co.
 Kioleides
 Piraeus Railway Works

India

 Abrol Engg Co
 Airflow Equipments
 Alstom, India
 Amtek Railcar Industries
 BEML Limited
 BESCO Limited (Wagon Division), India
 Bharat Wagon and Engineering
 Bombardier Transportation, India
 Braithwaite & Co.
 Burn Standard Company
 CREWPL
 Hindusthan Engineering & Industries
 Hind Rectifiers
 Integral Coach Factory Chennai
 Jessop & Company
 Jindal SAW
 Jupiter Wagons
 Medha Servo Drives
 Metlord Alloys Private Limited, Chennai
 Modern Coach Factory, Raebareli
 Rail Coach Factory, Kapurthala
 SAIL RITES Bengal Wagon Industry Private Limited
 Texmaco Rail & Engineering
 Titagarh Wagons
 SAN Engineering & Locomotive Co
 Universal Engineers Chennai Pvt Ltd
 Wabtec

Indonesia
 Industri Kereta Api

Iran
 Isfahan Kafriz
 Tehran Wagon Manufacturing Co.
 IRICO
IDRO
 Mapna Locomotive Engineering and Manufacturing Company
 Polour Sabz
 Taam Locomotive Arya
 Arvin Tabriz Co.
 Fadak Group – Rail Pardaz System Company
Isfahan Urban Railway Organization
Mapna Wagon Pars (the largest Rolling Stocks manufacturer in the Middle East)

Italy
 Tecnomasio Italiano Brown Boveri (now part of Bombardier Transportation)
 Corifer
 Firema (now part of Titagarh Wagons)
 Fiat Ferroviaria (now part of Alstom Transport)
 Hitachi Rail Italy

Japan
  (former )
 Fuji Heavy Industries
 Hitachi
 Kawasaki Heavy Industries Rolling Stock Company
 Kinki Sharyo
 Mitsubishi Heavy Industries
 Niigata Transys Company
 Nippon Sharyo
 J-TREC
 Toshiba
  (also known as Niigata Tekko)

North Korea

4 June Rolling Stock Works
Chongjin Bus Repair Factory (tram rebuilds)
Kim Chong-t'ae Electric Locomotive Works (1945–present)
Pyongyang Bus Repair Factory (tram rebuilds)

Malaysia
Trendline Wagon
SMH Rail Sdn Bhd

Mexico
 TYTAL (Trailers y Tanques de Aluminio SA de CV) Mexico
 Bombardier Transportation, Mexico 
 Constructora Nacional de Carros de Ferrocarril SA (CNCF) Ciudad, Sahagún
 Construcciones y Auxiliar de Ferrocarriles (CAF)
 Trinity Industries
Locomotoras San Luis S.A. de C.V.
Ferrovías del Bajío S.A. de C.V.

Pakistan
 Pakistan Locomotive Factory

Philippines
 Manila Railroad Caloocan Works (1929– 1950)
 Metal Industry Research and Development Center
 Ramcar, Inc. — Still extant as the Ramcar Group of Companies, but rolling stock business ended before World War II.

Poland
 Alstom, Poland
 Bombardier Transportation, Poland
 Newag
 PESA
 Stadler Rail
 Solaris Bus & Coach(Tram)

Romania
 Astra Rail Industries
 Astra Vagoane Călători
 Electroputere
 FAUR
 Electroputere VFU Paşcani
 Remarul 16 Februarie
 Softronic

Russia
 United Wagon Company
 Altayvagon
 Uralvagonzavod
 Sinara transport machines
 Transmashholding
 Bryansk Machine-Building Plant
 JSC ZMK (Saratov region, Engels)
 Transmash (Saratov region, Engels)
 Metrovagonmash
 UK RM RAIL
 Kambarka Engineering Works
 Tikhoretsk Machine Construction Plant n.a. Vorovsky
 Circon Service

Serbia
 Bratstvo
 Fabrika Vagona Kraljevo
 Goša FOM
 Mašinska Industrija Niš
 Siemens Kragujevac

Slovakia
 Avokov
 Tatravagonka Poprad
 ZOS Vrutky

Slovenia
 Sorbit valji
 Štore valji

South Africa 
 Bombardier Transportation, South Africa
 Gibela Rail Transport Consortium RF (Pty) Ltd
 Transnet Engineering
 Union Carriage & Wagon

South Korea
 Dawonsys
 Hyundai Rotem
 RS KOREA
 Sung Shin RST
 Woojin Industrial Systems

Spain
 Alstom, Spain
 Bombardier Transportation, Spain
 CAF - Construcciones y Auxiliar de Ferrocarriles 
 Stadler Rail
 Talgo

Sweden
 Bombardier Transportation
 Kiruna Wagon
 Kockums Industrier

Switzerland
 ABB (folded into Adtranz)
 Bombardier Transportation, Switzerland
 Schweizerische Industrie Gesellschaft (SIG)
 Stadler Rail

Taiwan
 Bombardier Transportation, Taiwan
 Taiwan Rolling Stock Company

Turkey
 BOZANKAYA A.Ş
 CSR-MNG Railway System Vehicles
 Durmazlar Holding
 EUROTEM
 TÜDEMSAŞ
 TÜLOMSAŞ
 Turkish Railway Machines Industry Inc
 Turkish Wagon Industry Inc
 TÜVASAŞ
 Vako Wagon Inc

United Kingdom
 
 Andrew Barclay Sons & Co.
 Ashbury Railway Carriage and Iron Company Ltd
 Beyer, Peacock & Company
 Birmingham Railway Carriage & Wagon Company
 Black, Hawthorn & Co
 Bombardier Transportation, UK
 British Rail Engineering Limited (BREL)
 British Thomson-Houston
 CAF Newport
 Dick, Kerr & Co
 Drewry Car Co
 Dübs & Co
 English Electric
 Glasgow Works
 Gloucester Railway Carriage & Wagon Company
 Hawthorn Leslie & Company
 Hitachi Newton Aycliffe
 Hudswell Clarke
 Hunslet Engine Company
 Kerr Stuart
 Leeds Forge Company
 Manning Wardle
 Metro-Cammell
 Metropolitan-Vickers
 Midland Railway Carriage and Wagon Company
 Nasmyth, Gaskell and Company
 North British Locomotive Company
 Pressed Steel Company
 R&W Hawthorn
 Robert Stephenson & Company
 Sentinel Waggon Works
 Swindon Works
 Vivarail
 Vulcan Foundry
 William Beardmore & Company
 Yorkshire Engine Company

United States
 Adrian Car Company (1869–1883) Adrian, Michigan
 W.C. Allison & Sons (c. 1840 – c. 1895) Philadelphia, Pennsylvania
 Allegheny Car Company (c. 1873 – 1882) Swissvale, Pennsylvania
 Alstom
 Altoona Manufacturing Company (c. 1870 – c. 1900) Altoona, Pennsylvania
 Aluminum Company of America (Alcoa)
 American Bridge Company (United States Steel)
 American Car & Foundry (ACF) (to ARI)
 American Car Company (1852–1856) Chicago, Illinois
 AMF, Beard, Texas
 Anniston Car Company (1883–1887) Anniston, Alabama
 ARI (American Railcar Industries, formerly AC&F), to Greenbrier 2019
 Austin-Western (to Baldwin-Lima-Hamilton 1951)
 Baker, Jackson & Company (1880s) Latrobe, Pennsylvania
 Baldwin-Lima-Hamilton (until 1963)
 Baltimore Car and Foundry
 Barney and Smith Car Company (1849 – c. 1923) Dayton, Ohio
 Beaver Falls Car Company (1880s) Beaver Falls, Pennsylvania
 Bellefonte Car Manufacturing Company (c. 1873 – 1881) Bellefonte, Pennsylvania
 Berwick Forge and Fabricating – Berwick, Pennsylvania (to Whittaker)
 Bethlehem Steel Corporation (1901–2003) Johnstown, Pennsylvania
 Bettendorf Company (c. 1902 – 1942) Bettendorf, Iowa
 Billmeyer and Small (1852 – c. 1910) York, Pennsylvania
 Blain Brothers Car Works (1880s) Huntingdon, Pennsylvania
 Bloomsburg Car Manufacturing Company (c. 1868 – c. 1900) Bloomsburg, Pennsylvania
 Bombardier Transportation, US
 Bowers, Dure & Company (1871–1886) Wilmington, Delaware
 Bridgeport Car Works (1870s) Bridgeport, Pennsylvania
 JG Brill Company (Brill)
 Brookville Equipment Corporation
 Budd Company (Budd) (1932–) Philadelphia, Pennsylvania
 Buffalo Car Manufacturing Company (1872–1890) Buffalo, New York
 Butler Manufacturing Company (1971–1973) Murfreesboro, Tennessee (built covered hoppers for NACC, later a NACC facility)
 Cambria Steel Company
 F.E. Canda & Company (until 1878) Chicago, Illinois
 Carlisle Manufacturing Company (c. 1870 – c. 1900) Carlisle, Pennsylvania
 Casebolt, Henry & Company (1863 – c. 1876) San Francisco, California
 Chattanooga Car & Foundry Company (1887–) Chattanooga, Tennessee
 Chicago Steel Car Company
 Chickasaw Ship Building & Car Company (1921–1928) Fairfield, Alabama
 Clark Car Company
 Cleveland Bridge & Car Works (1878–) Cleveland, Ohio
 W. Clough (1852–) Madison, Indiana
 Colorado Railcar
 Connellsville Machine and Car Company (1870s-1880s) Connellsville, Pennsylvania
 Conshohocken Car Works (1880–) Conshohocken, Pennsylvania
 Cummings Car Works (1851–1876) Jersey City, New Jersey
 Darby Corporation (1965–1989 ) Kansas City, Kansas
 Dauphin Car Works (1880s) Dauphin, Pennsylvania
 Davenport and Bridges (1834 – c. 1856) Cambridgeport, Massachusetts
 Davenport, Bridges & Company (1850s) Fitchburg, Massachusetts
 Dawson Manufacturing Company (c. 1870 – c. 1880) Dawson, Georgia
 Detroit Car and Manufacturing Company (1861–1870) Detroit, Michigan
 Detroit Car Works (1872–1879) Adrian (Detroit), Michigan
 DIFCO (originally Differential Steel Car Co.,) Findlay, Ohio (to Trinity)
 William Dyer
 East Railcar
 Eaton & Gilbert (1833–1893) Troy, New York
 Ebenezer Railcar, Buffalo, New York
 Edwards Rail Car Company (1921–1942)
 Edwards Rail Car Company (1997–2008)
 Elliott Car Company (c. 1885 – 1899) Gadsden, Alabama
 Elmira Car Manufactory (1862–1886) Elmira, New York
 Emmons Rail Car, York, Pennsylvania
 Empire Car Works (c. 1849 – c. 1890) York, Pennsylvania
 Ensign Manufacturing Company (c. 1873 – 1899) Huntington, West Virginia (to AC&F)
 Enterprise Railway Equipment Company
 Erie Car Works (1868 – c. 1920) Erie, Pennsylvania
 Evans Products (1964–1972) Plymouth, Michigan
 FMC (formerly Farm Machinery Corp.) (1965-) South Charleston, West Virginia, (1965-1985) Portland, Oregon with acquisition of GBEC
 Franklin Foundry Machine & Car Works (c. 1840 – c. 1880) Franklin, Pennsylvania
 Frederick & Company (c. 1870 – c. 1900) Catasaqua, Pennsylvania
 FreightCar America (formerly Johnstown America Corporation, originally Bethlehem Steel Corp.)
 Freight Car Services
 Fruehauf Rail Division (formerly Magor Car Corp.) (1964–1973) Clifton, New Jersey
 Fruit Growers Express (1922–) Alexandria, Virginia
 Fulton Car Works/Keck & Hubbard (1847 – c. 1860) Cincinnati, Ohio
 Fulton Car Works/W.W. Wetherell (1839–1860s) Sandusky, Ohio
 Gantt Manufacturing Company (1973–) Greenville, South Carolina
 General American Transportation Corp. (GATX) (1898–) Sharon, Pennsylvania/East Chicago, Indiana/Warren, Ohio (carbuilding operations to Trinity Industries 1984)
 General Steel Industries (GSI; formerly General Steel Castings) (c. 1962–1972) Granite City, Illinois
 Georgia Railcar (until 1883) Carterville, Georgia (to Portec 1978; to Thrall 1984)
 Georgia Car & Manufacturing Company (c. 1900–) Savannah, Georgia
 Gilbert Car Company
 The Gregg Company (c. 1900–) Hanensack, NJ; mainly export, mining and sugar plantation equipment
 John L. Gill (1862–1883) Columbus, Ohio
 John L. Gill, Jr. (until 1885) Allegheny, Pennsylvania
 Golden Tye (division of NRUC), Pickens, South Carolina
 James Goold & Company (1831 – c. 1890) Albany, New York
 The Greenbrier Companies (Greenbrier)
 Greenville Steel Car Company (GSC) (1916–) Greenville, Pennsylvania (to Trinity Industries 1986)
 Grice & Long (1860 – c. 1873) Trenton, New Jersey
 Grove Works (1848–1855) Hartford, Connecticut
 Gulf Railcar
 Gunderson Brothers Engineering Co. (GBEC)(1958–1973) Portland, Oregon (to FMC 1965)
 Gunderson (1985 with Greenbrier's acquisition of FMC)
 Hannibal Car Works (1870s) Hannibal, Missouri
 Harlan & Hollingsworth (1836 – c. 1945) Wilmington, Delaware
 Harrisburg Car Manufacturing Company (1853 – c. 1890) Harrisburg, Pennsylvania
 Harvey Steel Car and Repair Works (c. 1892) Harvey, Illinois
 Haskell and Barker Car Company (1852–1971) Michigan City, Indiana
 Hazelton Car Works (1880s) Hazelton, Pennsylvania
 Hicks Locomotive and Car Works (1897–1911) Chicago, Illinois
 Huntingdon Car Works (1872 – c. 1885) Huntingdon, Pennsylvania
 Illinois Car and Manufacturing Company (1897–1902) Chicago & Urbana, Illinois/Anniston, Alabama (to Western Steel Car 1902)
 Illinois Car & Manufacturing Company (c. 1909–) Hammond, Indiana
 Indiana Car Company (1872–1884) Cambridge City, Indiana
 Indianapolis Car Company (c. 1870 – c. 1900) Indianapolis, Indiana
 Indianapolis Car and Foundry
 Ingalls Shipbuilding, Pascagoula, Mississippi (built covered hoppers for NACC)
 International Car Company (ICC) (1952–) Buffalo, New York/Kenton, Ohio/East Chicago, Indiana (to PC&F)
 Richard Imlay (1830 – c. 1840) Baltimore, Ohio/Philadelphia, Pennsylvania
 Itel
 Jackson and Sharp Company (Delaware Car Works) (1863 – c. 1945) Wilmington, Delaware
 Jackson and Woodin Manufacturing Company (1861–) Berwick, Pennsylvania
 J.J. Finnigan, Duluth, Georgia
 Jones Car Works (1879 – c. 1912) West Troy, New York
 Kansas City Car & Wheel Company (c. 1880 – c. 1900) Kansas City & Armourdale, Missouri
 Kasgro
 William M. Kasson & Son (c. 1860 – c. 1870) Buffalo, New York
 H.T. & I.N. Keith (later Keith Car) (c. 1865 – c. 1935) West Sandwich, Sagamore & Hyannis, Massachusetts
 Kimball & Gorton (1849–1862) Philadelphia, Pennsylvania
 Kimball Manufacturing Company (1860 – c. 1876) San Francisco, California
 Koppel Car Company, Chicago, Illinois (to Pressed Steel Car)
 Laconia Car Company (1879–1928) Laconia, New Hampshire
 LaFayette Car Works (1880–) LaFayette, Indiana
 Laporte Car Manufacturing Company (1872 – c. 1878) Laporte, Indiana
 Lebanon Manufacturing Company (1870–) Lebanon, Pennsylvania
 Lehigh Valley Car Manufacturing Company (c. 1870–) Stemton, Pennsylvania
 Lenoir Car Company (1894–1930) Lenoir City, Tennessee
 Liberty Car and Equipment
 Lima Car Company (1880s) Lima, Ohio
 Litchfield Car Manufacturing Company (1872–) Litchfield, Illinois
 Locks & Canals (c. 1840 – c. 1850) Lowell, Massachusetts
 Madison Car Company (1891–) Madison, Illinois
 Magor Car Corporation (1902–1973) Passaic, New Jersey (to Fruehauf)
 Mansfield Machine Works (c. 1870–) Mansfield, Ohio
 Marathon Tank Car, Houston, Texas (to Richmond Tank Car)
 Marshall Car and Foundry Company (1880–) Marshall, Texas
 Mather Stock Car Company
 Maxson Corporation (formerly St. Paul Foundry & Manufacturing) (1966–) St. Paul, Minnesota
 McGuire, Cummings Manufacturing Company (c. 1890 – c. 1930) Chicago, Illinois
 McKee, Fuller & Company (1879–) Catasauqua, Pennsylvania
 McNary, Claflin & Company (1864–1878) Cleveland, Ohio
 Mechtron Industries (1974–1981) Wilmington, Delaware (built covered hoppers for NACC)
 Memphis Car & Foundry (1894–) Memphis, Tennessee
 Merchants Despatch Transportation Company
 Michigan Car Company (1864–1970) Detroit, Michigan (to AC&F)
 Michigan-Peninsular Car Company (to AC&F)
 Middletown Car Company (1869 – c. 1930) Middletown, Pennsylvania
 Midwest Freight Car (1973–) Clinton, Illinois (to Portec 1977)
 Millenium Rail
 Milwaukee Car Manufacturing Company (until 1910) Milwaukee, Wisconsin
 Minerva Car Works (c. 1880 – c. 1920) Minerva, Ohio
 Minnesota Car Company (1888–1896) Duluth, Minnesota
 Missouri Car and Foundry Company (1870–) St. Louis, Missouri (to AC&F)
 Morrison International, A.A. Morrison (to ICC)
 Morrison-Knudsen
 Mount Vernon Car Manufacturing Company (1888–1954) Mt. Vernon, Illinois (to Pressed Steel Car 1946)
 Mowry Car and Wheel Works (1851–1880) Cincinnati, Ohio
 Murray, Dougall and Company (1864–) Milton, Pennsylvania
 Muskegon Car and Engine Works (c. 1880 – 1886) Muskegon, Michigan
 National Alabama Corporation (NAC)
 National Railway Utilization Company (1976–) Pickens, South Carolina
 New Haven Car Company (c. 1860 – c. 1879) New Haven, Connecticut
 Newport News Shipbuilding Company
 Niagara Car Wheel Company
 Nobel Brothers & Company (1880s) Rome, Georgia
 Norca Machinery
 North American Car Corporation (1955–), Chicago, Illinois (carbuilding operations to Trinity Industries 1986)
 North Carolina Car Company (1882–) Raleigh, North Carolina
 North-Western Manufacturing Car Company (c. 1880–) Stillwater, Minnesota
 Norwich Car Company (1847 – c. 1852) Norwich, Connecticut
 Ohio Falls Car Manufacturing Company (1864 – c. 1945) Jeffersonville, Indiana (to AC&F)
 Ortner Freight Car Company (1953–) Covington, Kentucky (to Trinity Industries 1987)
 Osgood Bradley Car Company (c. 1833 – 1960) Worcester, Massachusetts
 Ostermann Manufacturing Company (1906–1911) West Pullman, Illinois
 Oxford Co-operative Car Company (1873 – c. 1878) Oxford, Pennsylvania
 Pacific Car and Foundry (PACCAR) (1905–) Renton, Washington/Portland, Oregon
 Paragon Bridge & Steel, Novi, Michigan (to Portec 1968)
 Pardee Car and Machine Works (c. 1875 – c. 1890) Watsontown, Pennsylvania
 Pardee, Snyder & Company (1880s) Williamsport, Pennsylvania
 Patten Car Works (1872 – c. 1890) Bath, Maine
 Patton Motor Company, Chicago
 Peninsular Car Company (1879–) Adrian & Detroit, Michigan
 Pennock Brothers (c. 1875 – c. 1915) Minerva, Ohio
 Pennsylvania Car Company (1880s) Latrobe & Ligonier, Pennsylvania
 Perley A. Thomas Car Works
 Petersburg Car Company (1873–) Petersburg, Virginia
 Pittsburgh Car Works (c. 1865 – 1883) Pittsburgh, Pennsylvania
 Pittsburgh & McKeesport Car Company (c. 1855 – 1877) McKeesport, Pennsylvania
 Portec, Inc. (1968–1984)(to Thrall 1984; autorack designs to Greenville 1986)
 Portland Company (1848–1912) Portland, Maine
 Progress Rail Albertville, Alabama
 Pressed Steel Car Company (1899–1954) Pittsburgh, Pennsylvania
 Pullman Company (Pullman)
 Pullman-Standard (PS) (to Trinity Industries 1984)
 Quick Car, Fort Worth, Texas (to Trinity Industries 1984)
 Ralston Steel Car Company (1905–1953) Columbus, Ohio
 Ranlet Car Company (c. 1845 – 1879) Laconia, New Hampshire
 Richmond Tank Car Company (1962–) Sheldon, Texas
 Richmond Car Works Richmond, Virginia
 Rohr, Inc.
 Russell & Company (c. 1854 – c. 1880) Massillon & Canton, Ohio
 Ryan Car Company (1906 – c. 1940) Hegewisch, Illinois
 St. Charles Car Company (until 1899) St. Charles, Missouri
 St. Lawrence Shops (division of NRUC), Norfolk, New York
 St. Louis Car Company (SLCC) (1887–1973) St. Louis, Missouri (to GSI 1960)
 St. Louis Car Works (1857–1862) St. Louis, Missouri
 St. Paul Foundry & Manufacturing, St. Paul, Minnesota (to Maxson Corp. c. 1968)
 Michael Schall (1870s-c. 1890) Middletown, Pennsylvania
 Schneider's Combination Cars, Chicago
 G.W. Snyder (c. 1850 – 1880s) Pottsville, Pennsylvania
 South Atlantic Car & Manufacturing Company (1903–) Waycross, Georgia
 South Baltimore Car Works (c. 1885 – c. 1930) Baltimore, Maryland
 Southeastern Specialties, Jacksonville, Florida
 Southern Car and Foundry (1899–1904) Lenoir City & Memphis, Tennessee & Gadsden, Alabama
 Southern Car and Wagon Manufactory (1850s) Memphis, Tennessee
 Southern Car Works (1881–) Knoxville, Tennessee
 Southern Iron & Equipment (1966–) Decatur, Georgia & Ashland City, Tennessee (to Evans)
 Southwark=Baldwin
 Springfield Car & Engine Company (1848 – c. 1857) Springfield, Massachusetts
 Standard Steel Car Company (1902–1930) (to Pullman-Standard)
 George H. Stem & Company (c. 1870 – c. 1885) Stemton, Pennsylvania
 John Stephenson & Company (1832–1842) New York, New York
 Street's Western Stable Car Line (c. 1885–) Chicago, Illinois
 Structural Steel Car Company (1902 – c. 1940) Canton, Ohio
 Swissvale Car Company (1873 – c. 1885) Swissvale, Pennsylvania
 Taunton Car Company (1869–1873) Taunton, Massachusetts
 Tennessee Coal, Iron and Railroad
 Terre Haute Car and Manufacturing Company (c. 1863 – c. 1930) Terre Haute, Indiana
 Thrall Car Manufacturing Company (Thrall) (1917–) Chicago Heights, Illinois (to Trinity Industries 2001)
 Tiffin Car Works (1872–) Tiffin, Ohio
 Timms Car Company (until 1882) Columbus, Ohio
 Tracy & Fales/Grove Works (1852 – c. 1857) Hartford, Connecticut
 Transco (1965–1966) Macon, Georgia
 Trenton Locomotive & Machine Manufacturing Company (1854–1863) Trenton, New Jersey
 Tredegar Company (c. 1850 – c. 1900) Richmond, Virginia
 James A. Trimble, New York City
 Trinity Industries (1978–present), Trinity Rail Group (2001–2004), TrinityRail (2004–present)
 Union Car and Bridge Works (1852–1856) Chicago, Illinois
 Union Car Works (1847–1857) York, Pennsylvania
 Union Car Works (1867–) St. Louis, Missouri
 Union Car Works (1893–1926) Depew, New York
 Union Tank Car Company (1947–) Whiting, Indiana
 United American Car, Cartersville, Georgia (to Thrall)
 United States Rolling Stock Company (1875–1893) Chicago Illinois
 United States Railway Equipment (USRE) (1954–) Blue Island, Illinois (to Evans)
 United Streetcar
 US Car and Foundry
 US Railcar
 Vertex Railcar
 Virginia Bridge & Iron Company (until 1920s) Roanoke, Virginia
 Wagner Palace Car Company (1887–1900) Buffalo & New York, New York
 Warren Tank Car Company (c. 1900–) Warren, Pennsylvania
 Charles Wason & Company (1852–1855) Cleveland, Ohio
 Wason Car and Foundry Company (1873–1885) Chattanooga, Tennessee
 Wason Manufacturing Company (1846–1932) Springfield, Massachusetts
 Watsontown Car Company (1870s) Watsontown, Pennsylvania
 Wayne Car & Engine Works (c. 1850 – 1857) Fort Wayne, Indiana
 Wells and French Company (c. 1860 – c. 1945) Chicago, Illinois
 Uriah Wells (1850s) Petersburg, Virginia
 West Pullman Car Works (until 1911) Pullman, Illinois
 Western Wheeled Scraper (1904–) (to Austin-Western)
 Western Steel Car and Foundry (1902 – c. 1940) Hegewisch, Illinois (to Pressed Steel Car)
 Witt, Harbeck & Company (1850–) Cleveland, Ohio
 Wharton & Petsch (1850–) Charleston, South Carolina
 Whittaker Industries (formerly Berwick Forge & Fabricating)
 Whitehead & Kales (1965–1967) River Rouge, Michigan (to Thrall 1984)
 Youngstown Car & Manufacturing Company (1881–1914) Youngstown, Ohio
 Youngstown Steel Car Company (1914–) Youngstown, Ohio

Defunct

Austria
 Simmering-Graz-Pauker (SGP) (acquired by Siemens)

Belgium
 La Brugeoise et Nivelles (bought by Bombardier, in turn bought by Alstom)

Canada
 AMF Technotransport, Montreal, Quebec
 Bombardier Transportation
 Canadian Car and Foundry (CANCAR) (to Hawker Siddeley Canada)
 Eastern Car Company, Trenton, Nova Scotia (to Hawker Siddeley Canada)
 Marine Industries, Sorel, Quebec
 Montreal Locomotive Works – Toronto Transit Commission subway cars
 National Steel Car (NSC), Hamilton, Ontario
 Preston Car Company
 Hawker Siddeley Canada, Trenton, Nova Scotia and Thunder Bay, Ontario (to Trenton Works)
 Ottawa Car Company – interurban cars
 Trenton Works, Trenton, Nova Scotia (to Greenbrier 1995)
 Urban Transportation Development Corporation, Thunder Bay, Ontario

France

Germany
 Adtranz (bought by Bombardier, in turn bought by Alstom)
 Daimler-Benz (folded into Adtranz)
 Allgemeine Elektricitäts-Gesellschaft AG (AEG) (merged into Adtranz)
 LEW Hennigsdorf (AEG to East German state owned back to AEG)

Hungary
Ganz Works
MÁVAG

Latvia 
 Rīgas Vagonbūves Rūpnīca

Mexico 
 Concarril (CNCF) (1950s–1992, then acquired by Bombardier)

Sweden
 ASEA
 Kalmar Verkstad (KVAB) (acquired by Bombardier)

See also

 List of locomotive manufacturers
 List of tram builders
 List of railway companies

References 

Notes

External links
 List of mostly European rolling stock and locomotive manufacturers and their websites (in French).

List of manufacturers
Rolling stock manufacturers
Rolling stock manufacturers